Like Water for Chocolate may refer to:

 Like Water for Chocolate (novel), by Laura Esquivel
 Like Water for Chocolate (film), a 1992 film based on the novel
 Like Water for Chocolate (album), by Common
 Like Water for Chocolate (ballet), a three-act ballet by Christopher Wheeldon

See also
 Water for Chocolate, a 2006 album by Deni Hines